Wolodymyr "Walter" Zakaluzny (May 2, 1925 – September 1, 2013) was a Canadian international soccer player who earned two caps for the national team in 1957.

He made his professional debut for Sian Przemyśl. After World War II, Zakaluzny moved to West Germany where he lived in a displaced persons camp from 1945 to 1950. He played soccer for a number of teams in Germany such as Ukraina Ulm, Phönix Karlsruhe, Dnister Zuffenhausen, Sitch Regensburg, Jahn Regensburg and Schwaben Augsburg.

As a Ukrainian immigrant to Canada, Zakaluzny played for a number of soccer teams in North America, including the Toronto Ukrainians, the Rochester Ukrainians, the Toronto Tridents, and the Montreal Ukrainians.

Zakaluzny died on September 1, 2013 from natural causes.

References

Ukrainian footballers
Canadian soccer players
Canadian expatriate soccer players
Expatriate soccer players in the United States
Canadian expatriate sportspeople in the United States
Canada men's international soccer players
Ukrainian emigrants to Canada
Canadian National Soccer League players
Association football midfielders
1925 births
2013 deaths
People from Przemyśl
People from Lwów Voivodeship
Sportspeople from Podkarpackie Voivodeship
SSV Jahn Regensburg players
Karlsruher SC players
Sian Przemyśl players
TSV Schwaben Augsburg players
Toronto Ukrainians players
Rochester Ukrainians players
Toronto Tridents players
Montreal Ukrainians players